Cinfães is a village and a municipality in the northern district of Viseu, Portugal. The village proper has about 3,300 inhabitants. The population of the municipality in 2011 was 20,427, in an area of 239.29 km2.

Its history is linked to the first king of Portugal, Afonso Henriques and several noblemen of his entourage, like the server Egas Moniz. In Cinfães existed several fortified houses or towers like "Torre da Chã" destroyed during the first half of the 20th century.

It has an important heritage resource, especially the Romanesque churches such as St. Cristóvão de Nogueira; Santa Maria Maior de Tarouquela, Igreja do Escamarão, Ermida do Douro among many important others churches, specially dated to the Baroque period, like the one of São Pedro of Ferreiros de Tendais, and Santa Cristina of Tendais.

The present mayor is Armando Mourisco, elected by the Socialist Party. The municipal holiday is June 24 (st. John's day).

Parishes
Administratively, the municipality is divided into 14 civil parishes (freguesias):

 Alhões, Bustelo, Gralheira e Ramires
 Cinfães
 Espadanedo
 Ferreiros de Tendais
 Fornelos
 Moimenta
 Nespereira
 Oliveira do Douro
 Santiago de Piães
 São Cristóvão de Nogueira
 Souselo
 Tarouquela
 Tendais
 Travanca

Sanfins
Sanfins (also known as Sanfins da Beira) was a council within the municipality of Cinfães. It was given a foral in 1514 a status it kept until  1855. This area in the Douro region is now part of the Cinfães municipality.

Notable people 
 Alexandre de Serpa Pinto (1846 at the castle of Polchras in Tendais – 1900) Viscount of Serpa Pinto, a Portuguese explorer of southern Africa and a colonial administrator; Governor of Cape Verde, 1894/8.
 Rui Cardoso (born 1994) a Portuguese footballer with over 100 club caps

References

External links
Town Hall official website
Photos from Cinfães

Villages in Portugal
Populated places in Viseu District
Municipalities of Viseu District
People from Cinfães